Lady in the Lake is a 1947 American film noir starring Robert Montgomery, Audrey Totter, Lloyd Nolan, Tom Tully, Leon Ames and Jayne Meadows. An adaptation of the 1943 Raymond Chandler murder mystery The Lady in the Lake, the picture was also Montgomery's directorial debut, and last in either capacity for Metro-Goldwyn-Mayer (MGM) after eighteen years with the studio.

As director, Montgomery's ambition was to create a cinematic version of the first-person narrative style of Chandler's Philip Marlowe novels. With the exception of a pair each of reflections in a mirror and direct addresses to the audience in character Marlowe is never seen: the balance of the film is shot from the point of view of the central character, seeing only what he does. MGM promoted the film with the claim that it was the first of its kind and the most revolutionary style of film since the introduction of the talkies. The movie was also unusual for having virtually no instrumental soundtrack, employing a wordless vocal chorus in lieu.

The film did not use the 195-page screenplay adaptation Chandler penned for MGM in 1945.  Instead, a 125-page version written by Steve Fisher was filmed two years later. Seeking to capitalize on an intended Christmas theme, the script changes the novel's midsummer setting to the Holidays, frequently using cheery Yuletide themes as an ironic counterpoint to grim aspects of the story. The opening credits appear on a stack of Christmas cards, the last of which reveals a handgun.

Plot

Tired of the low pay of his profession, hard-boiled Los Angeles private detective Phillip Marlowe submits a murder story to Kingsby Publications. He is invited to the publisher's offices to discuss his work, but soon realizes it is merely a ploy. A few days before Christmas, publishing executive Adrienne Fromsett hires him to locate Chrystal Kingsby, the wife of her boss, Derace Kingsby. One month earlier, Kingsby’s wife had sent her husband a telegram saying she was heading to Mexico to divorce him and marry a man named Chris Lavery. But, according to Fromsett, Lavery says he has not seen Chrystal for two months, and the telegram appears to be fake. It becomes obvious to Marlowe that Fromsett wants her boss for herself.

Marlowe goes to see Lavery, who claims to know nothing about any trip to Mexico. Lavery, however, says that Mrs. Kingsby was a beautiful woman before revising it to "is." He sucker-punches the detective, and Marlowe wakes up in jail. He is questioned by Captain Kane and a belligerent Lieutenant DeGarmot. Marlowe refuses to divulge anything, and Kane releases him.

Marlowe learns that a woman's body has been recovered from a lake on which Kingsby owns property, and that Kingsby's caretaker, Mr. Chess, was charged with the murder of his wife Muriel. Fromsett suspects that Chrystal is the real killer, as she and Muriel hated each other. Little Fawn Lake was also where Chrystal was last seen. Marlowe learns that Muriel was an alias for a woman named Mildred Havelend and that she was hiding from a tough cop, whose description fits DeGarmot.

Marlowe goes to see Lavery again. Inside the unlocked house, he encounters Lavery's landlady, Mrs. Fallbrook, holding a gun she claims to have just found. Upstairs, he finds Lavery dead, shot several times. He also finds a handkerchief with the monogram "A F".

Before calling the police, Marlowe goes to the publishing house to confront Fromsett, interrupting a Christmas party. In private, she denies killing Lavery. Kingsby, learning that Fromsett had hired Marlowe to find Chrystal, tells her theirs will be strictly a business relationship from now on. A furious Fromsett fires the private eye, but Kingsby immediately hires him to find his wife.

Marlowe informs the police of Lavery's death. At the scene, he suggests that Muriel was hiding from DeGarmot. DeGarmot slaps Marlowe, and the two men scuffle. Kane takes Marlowe into custody, releasing him only out of Christmas spirit.

Marlowe obtains more information on Muriel from a newspaper contact. She had been a suspect in the suspicious death of her previous employer's wife. The investigating detective, DeGarmot, ruled that death a suicide; the victim's parents strongly disagreed. Marlowe finds the parents have been intimidated into silence. His car is then run off the road by DeGarmot. Regaining consciousness after the crash, Marlowe gets to a pay phone and calls Fromsett for help. She takes him to her apartment, where she claims that she has fallen in love with him. They spend Christmas Day together while he recovers from his injuries.

Kingsby receives a phone call from his wife, asking for money and, unable to find Marlowe, goes to Fromsett's apartment to ask her if she has seen the detective. Marlowe agrees to give Kingsby's money to Chrystal, as Kingsby is being followed by police detectives. Placing his trust in Fromsett, Marlowe instructs her to have the police trail him, following a trail of rice he will leave.

The woman Marlowe meets turns out to be Mildred Havelend, alias the "landlord" Mrs. Fallbrook, alias Muriel. She killed Chrystal – the "lady in the lake" of the title – in addition to her former employer's wife and Lavery. DeGarmot was in love with Havelend and helped her cover up the first murder. Then she fled from him and married Chess.

Havelend pulls a gun on Marlowe in her apartment. DeGarmot tracks them down, having overheard Fromsett speaking to Captain Kane and following Marlowe's trail of rice. He plans to kill them both with Havelend's gun and stage it to look like she and Marlowe shot each other. DeGarmot then shoots a pleading Mildred several times. Kane arrives just in time to gun down his own crooked cop.

Cast
 Robert Montgomery as Phillip Marlowe ("Phillip" spelled with two "l"s, rather than with one)
 Audrey Totter as Adrienne Fromsett
 Lloyd Nolan as Lt. DeGarmot
 Tom Tully as Capt. Kane
 Leon Ames as Derace Kingsby
 Jayne Meadows as Muriel, aka Mildred Havelend, aka Mrs. Fallbrook
 Richard Simmons as Chris Lavery
 Morris Ankrum as Eugene Grayson
 Lila Leeds as Receptionist
 Robert Williams as Artist
 Kathleen Lockhart as Mrs. Grayson

The "actress" credited as playing Chrystal Kingsby, "Ellay Mort", is an inside joke, as the character is never seen in the film. The name is a homonym of the French "elle est morte", meaning "she is dead".

Production
Making Lady in the Lake was Robert Mongtomery's idea.  He had stood in as director for John Ford on They Were Expendable when Ford got sick, and he wanted to direct again.  He convinced MGM to buy the rights to Chandler's latest novel, The Lady in the Lake, for which the studio paid a reported $35,000.  Since Chandler had co-written the screenplay for Double Indemnity with Billy Wilder, for which he received an Academy Award nomination, and then had received another nomination for his script for The Blue Dahlia, Montgomery wanted Chandler to write the screenplay for Lady in the Lake.  This resulted in the 195-page screenplay which has been called "remarkably bad".  Montgomery then brought in Steve Fisher to completely re-write the screenplay. (Chandler and Fisher had both been writers for Black Mask magazine in the 1930s.) Fisher made major changes, such as re-setting the time of the film to the Christmas holiday, and dropping all the scenes which took place at the lake.  Chandler objected to these changes, and was insulted that another writer was changing his story, but he still insisted that he be given a screenplay credit, until he saw the final result, when he demanded that his name be removed from the film.

Montgomery tried a technique that had often been talked about in Hollywood but never used in a major film: he used the camera as the protagonist of the film. Other characters talk directly to the camera. The voice of Marlowe is that of Montgomery, but his face is shown only in reflections.  MGM objected to Montgomery's first-person idea, since it meant that the star of the film would only be seen infrequently; so the studio insisted that Montgomery film a prologue where Marlowe, in his office, explains what was happening; the setting was returned to briefly several times during the film, and at the end. Various techniques had to be devised to make the subjective camera look realistic. For instance, in order to simulate the protagonist walking, John Arnold, executive head of photography at MGM, developed a new kind of camera dolly, with four independent wheels, allowing the dolly to walk through doors and up stairs.  A seat was also attached to the front of the dolly for Montgomery to sit in, so that the actors could see and play off of him as filming took place.  For the fight scenes, Paul Vogel, the director of photography, used a modified Eyemo camera with a flexible shoulder harness.

Reviews of the film were not appreciative of the new approach. Most critics gave the director credit for trying an experimental technique but felt that it was a "gimmick", and that the experiment had been a failure.

Box office
According to MGM records the film earned $1,812,000 in the US and Canada and $845,000 elsewhere resulting in a profit of $598,000.

Critical response
Author and film critic Leonard Maltin awarded the film two and a half out of four stars, commending its first person perspective storytelling, but criticized its confusing plot and dated presentation.

Radio adaptation
Lux Radio Theater presented a 60-minute radio adaptation of the movie on February 9, 1948, with Montgomery and Totter reprising their roles. A recording of the production is available as a streaming audio.

See also
 List of Christmas films

References
Informational notes

Citations

External links
 
 
 
 
 

1947 films
1947 crime drama films
1947 mystery films
American Christmas films
American crime drama films
American detective films
American mystery films
American black-and-white films
Film noir
Films based on American novels
Films based on works by Raymond Chandler
Films directed by Robert Montgomery (actor)
Films shot from the first-person perspective
Metro-Goldwyn-Mayer films
1940s Christmas films
1947 directorial debut films
1940s English-language films
1940s American films